Navicula depressa is a freshwater species of algae of in the genus Navicula. Navicula depressa occurs in Fennoscandia.

References

Further reading
 
 

depressa
Species described in 1891